The Bowman House is a historic log house located at 323 North Main Street in Boonsboro, Maryland, and is locally significant as a typical example of those built in the area in the early 19th century.

Description and history 
The house and its immediate grounds housed the "Boonsboro Pottery" from 1868, owned by John E. Bowman. The pottery closed by 1908, succumbing to mass-produced materials. The building is now the headquarters of the Boonsboro Historical Society.

It was listed on the National Register of Historic Places on April 29, 1977.

References

External links
Information on visiting the Bowman House
, including photo in 1999, at Maryland Historical Trust

Boonsboro, Maryland
Houses completed in 1826
Houses on the National Register of Historic Places in Maryland
Museums in Washington County, Maryland
Historic house museums in Maryland
Houses in Washington County, Maryland
1826 establishments in Maryland
National Register of Historic Places in Washington County, Maryland